The Sinclair President is a calculator released by Sinclair Radionics in early 1978. There were two models, the President and the President Scientific. They were among the last calculators produced by Sinclair, and their large size was in contrast to the smaller, earlier models, like the Sinclair Executive, which made the company famous. The President models were related to the Sporting Life SETTLER, a calculator designed specifically for betting shops.

History
It was the only Sinclair calculator not made in England but instead made in Hong Kong by Radofin. Competition in the calculator market was by this point fierce, and the Sinclair did not fare well against cheaper Japanese calculators with more efficient liquid-crystal displays. The silver paint used was of poor quality and was notorious for wearing off.

Design
Power was supplied by 2x AA batteries. The screens were eight-digit vacuum fluorescent displays, which resulted in a higher power consumption than a calculator with a liquid-crystal display.

The President, as well as addition, subtraction, multiplication and division, had percentage, memory, square root and square functions. It was powered by a National Semiconductor MM57134ENW/M integrated circuit. The President Scientific added logarithmic and trigonometric functions. It was powered by a General Instrument CF-599.

Sporting Life Settler
The Sporting Life SETTLER was a calculator designed for betting shops, with development sponsored by Sporting Life. Due to the increased pressure on the calculator market, a number of calculators meant for a specific purpose where there was less competition were produced. It was also produced in Hong Kong by Radofin.

References

Sinclair calculators